Hira Schools in Pakistan are a Jamaat-e-Islami Pakistan-sponsored Islamic school system that operates more than 215 schools and 10 colleges across Pakistan. It is a universal education project run by the Hira National Education Foundation, a non-governmental, non-profit and non-sectarian organization working in the field of education since 1997. 

The project is sponsored by Jamaat-e-Islami Pakistan. The system has branches in all four Pakistani provinces, including Kashmir, FATA and Gilgit-Baltistan. The system offers education ranging from preschool to secondary level in addition to a program of preparatory courses towards the completion of a Secondary School Certificate. Hira Schools maintain low tuition fees to allow low-income students to enroll.

History 
Tanzeem-e-Asatiza Pakistan (Teachers Association of Pakistan), a teacher wing of Jamaat-e-Islami Pakistan, introduced the Hira educational project in the late 1990s.

Enrollment 
It operates 215 schools and 10 colleges across the country. The system employs 2,045 male and 1,415 female teachers who provide instruction to the 32,000 male and 28,700 female students.

Organizational structure 
The Hira Educational Foundation organizes all the branches, develops curriculum, conducts faculty training and inspects schools.

Curriculum 
The curriculum is provided by the Association For Academic Quality (AFAQ)  and includes AFAQ's Sun Series and AFAQ's Iqbal Series of textbooks.

See also 
Alkhidmat Foundation
Jamaat-e- Islami Pakistan
Hira Model High School Mandani

References 

School systems in Pakistan
Jamaat-e-Islami Pakistan
Islamic schools in Pakistan